Sophie Roberge (born October 18, 1973 in Quebec City, Quebec) is a Canadian former judoka who competed in the 2000 Summer Olympics.

References

See also
Judo in Canada

1973 births
Living people
Canadian female judoka
French Quebecers
Judoka at the 2000 Summer Olympics
Olympic judoka of Canada
Sportspeople from Quebec City